Deramas nelvis is a butterfly in the family Lycaenidae. It was described by John Nevill Eliot in 1964. It is found in  the Indomalayan realm.

Subspecies
Deramas nelvis nelvis (Peninsular Malaysia, Sumatra)
Deramas nelvis sumatrensis Eliot, 1964 (Sumatra)

References

External links
Deramas at Markku Savela's Lepidoptera and Some Other Life Forms

Deramas
Butterflies described in 1964